The New Statesman is a British political and cultural magazine.

New Statesman or New Statesmen may also refer to:
The New Statesman (1984 TV series), a British television sitcom starring Windsor Davies
The New Statesman (1987 TV series), a 1987–1994 British television series starring Rik Mayall
New Statesmen, a comic strip written by John Smith and published in Crisis

See also
 Statesman (disambiguation)